Jim Jenkinson (born 1 June 1943) is a former Australian rules footballer who played with Melbourne in the Victorian Football League (VFL).

Notes

External links 		

		
		
		
		
1943 births
Living people
Australian rules footballers from Victoria (Australia)		
Melbourne Football Club players
Hamilton Imperials Football Club players